Rejiche is a town and commune in the Mahdia Governorate, Tunisia. , it had a population of 8,925. It is a southern suburb of Mahdia, lying on the coast.

See also
List of cities in Tunisia

References

Populated places in Mahdia Governorate
Communes of Tunisia
Tunisia geography articles needing translation from French Wikipedia